CMCS can refer to:
Cambrian Medieval Celtic Studies
Community Magnet Charter School